The Hôtel Brion, also known as Villa Brion, is a small Art Nouveau hôtel particulier on rue Sleidan in the Neustadt district of Strasbourg, in the French department of the Bas-Rhin. It has been classified as a Monument historique since 1975.

History
The hôtel particulier was built by the architect, Auguste Brion (1861–1940), for himself in 1904. Brion, the scion of a family of artists directly related to the legendary Friederike Brion, was a prolific architect who built four other houses in the same street between 1903 and 1905. The hôtel is executed in a more exuberant style than most of Brion's other realizations. For the structure, the architect used timber framing and walls of reinforced concrete the surface of which he then covered with stonemasonry. Between 1926 and 1972, the Hôtel Brion was used as an actual hotel, called Hôtel Marguerite. It is again in private hands since 1980.

Gallery

References

External links

Villa Brion – 22 rue Sleidan on archi-wiki.org

Literature
Recht, Roland; Foessel, Georges; Klein, Jean-Pierre: Connaître Strasbourg, 1988, page 272

See also
Villa Schutzenberger

Art Nouveau architecture in Strasbourg
Hotel buildings completed in 1904
Monuments historiques of Strasbourg
20th-century architecture
Art Nouveau houses
Hôtels particuliers in Strasbourg